Vagenda, a portmanteau of vagina and agenda, may refer to:

 The Vagenda, a feminist online magazine launched in January 2012.
 Hidden Vagenda, the fourth solo album by American singer-songwriter Kimya Dawson